Ambrosio Angelini (1636–1710) was a Roman Catholic prelate who served as Bishop of Acquapendente (1697–1710).

Biography 
Ambrosio Angelini was born in San Constance, Italy on 14 April 1636. On 20 November 1697, he was appointed during the papacy of Pope Innocent XII as Bishop of Acquapendente. On 24 November 1697, he was consecrated bishop by Pier Matteo Petrucci, Cardinal-Priest of San Marcello, with Prospero Bottini, Titular Archbishop of Myra, and Giuseppe Felice Barlacci, Bishop Emeritus of Narni, serving as co-consecrators. He served as Bishop of Acquapendente until his death on 9 December 1710.

References

External links and additional sources
 (for Chronology of Bishops) 
 (for Chronology of Bishops)  

17th-century Italian Roman Catholic bishops
18th-century Italian Roman Catholic bishops
Bishops appointed by Pope Innocent XII
1636 births
1710 deaths